The Museum of Fashion and Costume (the Costume Gallery) is one of the museums housed in the Pitti Palace in Florence .

It is housed at the Palazzina della Meridiana, a pavilion south of the main palace, accessible from the Boboli Gardens .

It was founded in 1983. The collections span the period from the 18th century to the present, including more than 6000 objects.

Exhibitions 
 2017 The Ephemeral Museum of Fashion

Gallery

References

External links 

 Official website

1983 establishments in Italy
Palazzo Pitti
Museums in Florence